Liu Chang (942–980), originally Liu Jixing (劉繼興), was the fourth, last and youngest Chinese emperor of Southern Han during the Five Dynasties and Ten Kingdoms period, reigning from 958 until his country was annexed by the Song dynasty in 971.

Life
He succeeded his father Liu Sheng because he was the eldest son. He only left eunuchs in power in his court and mandated castration for anyone who he wanted to work for his court because he believed people with children could not be completely loyal. When Liu Chang became Emperor he was only a "mere youth".

Reign 
Liu became Emperor when he was sixteen years old. Historical records report that Liu Chang spent so much time with his harem that he abandoned government affairs. His most favorite concubine was one young Persian girl he called Mèi Zhū (媚豬). The "History of Five dynasties and Ten Kingdoms" described the Persian woman as having copper colored skin and large eyes. It was told that she loved pearls so Liu Chang ordered fishermen to dive to find thousands of pearls for his Persian lover Mei Zhu. Many of the fishermen died. He gave her a pearl dudou, pearl crowns, pearl blouses, and pearl skirts. He also used pearls and silver to renovate his palaces.

The historical text Spring and Autumn Annals of the Ten Kingdoms recorded that Liu Chang indulged in sex games. He had alchemists create aphrodisiacs to induce sexual desire as pregame warmup. One of his games was called "Naked in Twos" (大體雙) in which he paired young men with palace women, made them strip naked and have sex together while he and his Persian lover were carried around to watch them. Liu and Mei Zhu then decided whether the man or woman "won". If the man "defeated" the woman, both were rewarded, but if the woman won and defeated the man, Liu had the man castrated.

Liu had sex all day and night and his body was physically unable to bear it, so he started to learn Jianyang techniques (健阳法) to invigorate his "yang" male energy (Jianyang involves increasing sexual desire and delaying ejaculation and orgasm, also see Taoist sexual practices). The Historical Records of the Five Dynasties says that Liu Chang spent all his time in the harem, and that he never came out to handle governance work, leaving it to Kong Chengshu and the eunuchs to take over government business. The naked orgies he had were similar to those his uncle Liu Bin had.

Graphic descriptions of what the Persian woman and Liu Chang did together were recorded in Qingyilu written by Tao Gu. The Yanyibian (豔異編) gives the same account as the Qingyilu. They mention a hall installed in his palace called "Hou chuang jian" (候窗監) where he indulged himself with her.

The fact that Liu Chang's harem had Persian girls is seen as evidence for the existence of a Persian community in southern China during this time. There was a thriving Persian community in Guangzhou during the 10th-12th centuries. The Persians in Guangzhou were called either Bosi 波斯 (Parsi) or Pusaman (菩萨蛮 "Bussulman") meaning "Muslim" in Persian.

Liu Chang also employed women shamans. He is also known to have held the "Red Cloud Banquet", a festival for the litchi fruit.

He was the last Emperor of Southern Han as his kingdom was defeated and taken over by the Song dynasty in 972. He reigned for a total of 14 years.

Family

Known Concubines
Noble Consort Li (李貴妃)
Beautiful Lady Li (李美人)
Lu Qiongxian, Talented Lady (才人 盧瓊仙)
Su Xin, Beautiful Lady (美人 素馨)
Mei Zhu (媚豬)

Sons
Liu Shoujie (劉守節)
Liu Shouzheng (劉守正)
Liu Shousu (劉守素)
Liu Shoutong (劉守通)

Statues of two of Liu Chang's sons were described as looking like "barbarian devils" and they may have come from the Persian woman.

See also
Iranians in China
Li Shunxian
Wang Zongyan
Lin Nu

References

942 births
980 deaths
Southern Han emperors
Song dynasty politicians from Guangdong
Politicians from Guangzhou